Hamletmachine is a postmodernist drama by German playwright and theatre director Heiner Müller. Written in 1977, the play is loosely based on Hamlet by William Shakespeare. The play originated in relation to a translation of Shakespeare's Hamlet that Müller undertook. Some critics claim the play problematizes the role of intellectuals during the East German Communism era; others argue that the play should be understood in relation to wider post-modern concepts. Characteristic of the play is that it is not centred on a conventional plot, but partially connects through sequences of monologues, where the protagonist leaves his role and reflects on being an actor.

Overview
The play is constituted of scenes. The whole text is roughly nine pages long. The script itself is extremely dense and open to interpretation; recurring themes include feminism and the ecology movement.

The play remains Müller's most-often performed and (arguably) his best-known today; Müller himself directed a seven-and-a-half-hour performance of Hamlet (in which Die Hamletmaschine was the play-within-a-play) in Berlin in 1990.

Performance history
Hamletmachine had its world premiere in 1979 at Théâtre Gérard Philipe in Saint-Denis, France. The U.S. premiere of the play was performed in March 1984 by Freies Theater München at the University of South Florida. This was followed in December of the same year by a production at the Theater for the New City in New York and in May 1986 by a production at New York University, which was directed by Robert Wilson.

The British premiere was on March 7, 1985, at the Gate Theatre in London, in a double bill with Heiner Müller's Mauser, both directed by Paul Brightwell, who had previously directed a student production of Müller's Cement at the University of Essex. The production of Hamletmachine was described as "a stage teeming with images" and "an electrifying message from East Germany" by Nicholas De Jongh in The Guardian.

In 1992, the play was presented by the University of California, Irvine, directed by Keith Fowler, as a bloody fantasy set in a "Frankenstein laboratory," in which industrial meat hooks served to "float" Ophelia.  In 2002, the Los Angeles Times published a 35-year retrospective of cutting edge art "on the wilder side," and UC Irvine's Hamletmachine was one of five "bloodiest" events listed.

In 1992 Josef Szeiler and Aziza Haas elaborated the Hamletmachine in Tokyo in parallel to a production of Hamlet by the Tokyo Engeki Ensemble, known for its traditional Brecht adaptations, which was confronted with the open and experimental approach Szeiler and Haas had first developed as members of TheaterAngelusNovus. The project resulted in a new translation of Hamletmachine into Japanese and 15 experimental performances ranging from 45 minutes to 12 hours. It was documented in the book HamletMaschine.Tokyo.Material.

In 2007 it was performed in the Samuel Beckett Theatre in Dublin, Ireland, directed by Paul Carton.

In 2010, Wang Chong directed the first production of Hamletmachine in China. References to the Chinese and North Korean political situations caused controversy. However, the show toured Beijing and Hangzhou without getting banned. The show was performed by four Chinese opera actors and one child. Critics called it "deconstructed Chinese opera" and "the most exciting work at the Beijing International Fringe Festival".

In 2016 Vitalyi Goltsov directed the first production of Hamletmachine in Ukraine. It was in Chernihiv Teatre of puppets. In 2020 director Roza Sarkisyan and writer Joanna Wichowska collaborated on a new production entitled H-Effect, which combined this play and Hamlet in a postdramatic theatre production.

Adaptations
Hamletmachine has had various adaptations in other media:

 Hamletmachine, a radio drama, including music by Einstürzende Neubauten, which was released as a compact disc in 1991. Blixa Bargeld played the part of Prince Hamlet and Gudrun Gut played Ophelia.
 Die Hamletmaschine-Oratorio, an oratorio by composer Georges Aperghis
 Die Hamletmaschine, a 1987 opera by Wolfgang Rihm
 Szenische Kammermusik nach Heiner Müllers “Hamletmaschine”, a 1991 classical piece for five instruments by Ruth Zechlin
 Hamletmachine: A Non-Long Movie, a 2010 short film by Barcelona filmmaker Agustin Calderon. In 2016, the film was released on the website Vimeo.

Works influenced by Hamletmachine
In 2013, Citi Garage Theatre in Santa Monica, CA premiered Opheliamachine, a postmodernist drama by the Polish-born American playwright and dramaturg, Magda Romanska. Opheliamachine was a response to Heiner Mueller's Hamletmachine. The production received critical acclaim from many LA-based media.

Recordings
 Die Hamletmaschine (with Blixa Bargeld), Rough Records 1991
 Maschine (by Ester Brinkmann), Supposé 1998

References

External links
 English translation of Die Hamletmaschine
 Alternative English translation of Die Hamletmaschine
 Hamletmachine a non-long movie by Agustín Calderón

Plays by Heiner Müller
Einstürzende Neubauten albums
1977 plays
1991 albums
Plays and musicals based on Hamlet
East German plays
Postmodern plays